Jeremy Purvis, Baron Purvis of Tweed (born 15 January 1974) is a Scottish Liberal Democrat politician.  He was the Member of the Scottish Parliament (MSP) for Tweeddale, Ettrick and Lauderdale from 2003 to 2011. In  August 2013 it was announced that he would be elevated to the House of Lords.

He is the leader of the Devo Plus cross-party group.

Background
He was born in Berwick-upon-Tweed, England, where he later attended school. He studied Politics and Modern History at Brunel University in London, graduating in 1996.  While at university he worked for the ELDR (Liberal) Group in the European Parliament and Liberal International.

Career
On graduating, Purvis worked full-time for Sir David Steel in the House of Commons and then ran his office in the House of Lords. In 1998 he moved to Edinburgh to work for a parliamentary affairs company and in 2001 he established, with a fellow director, his own strategic communications consultancy, advising clients on communications.

He was elected to the Scottish Parliament in 2003 aged 29, making him the youngest constituency MSP at the time. He was the Scottish Liberal Democrat Finance Spokesman and then moved on to become Justice and Home Affairs spokesman.  He was re-elected in 2007 following a close campaign, with some of the media stating that the Scottish National Party candidate Christine Grahame would defeat him.  Ultimately, both parties greatly increased their vote shares at the expense of the Conservatives and Labour. Purvis's margin declined by 0.2 percentage points but increased by 65 votes; this discrepancy was due to a vast increase in turnout in the 2007 election. He was subsequently defeated by Grahame in the 2011 election.

He was the Scottish Liberal Democrats Spokesman for the Economy and Finance. Mr Purvis wrote the Scottish Liberal Democrats 2011 Election Manifesto.  He currently lives in Galashiels.

He was created a life peer on 13 September 2013 taking the title Baron Purvis of Tweed, of East March in the Scottish Borders.

In November 2016 he was announced as a member of the Commission on Parliamentary Reform, having been nominated to represent the Scottish Liberal Democrats.

References

External links
 
Jeremy Purvis MSP profile at the site of Scottish Liberal Democrats

1974 births
Living people
People from Berwick-upon-Tweed
Liberal Democrat MSPs
Members of the Scottish Parliament 2003–2007
Members of the Scottish Parliament 2007–2011
Liberal Democrats (UK) life peers
Life peers created by Elizabeth II